Chen Ta-ching (1904–1973) was a Kuomintang general from Jiangxi, Republic of China. Chen was the Governor of Taiwan Province from 1969 to 1972 and the Minister of Defense from 1972 to 1973.

|-

1904 births
1973 deaths
National Revolutionary Army generals from Jiangxi
Politicians from Ganzhou
Republic of China politicians from Jiangxi
Chairpersons of the Taiwan Provincial Government
Taiwanese Ministers of National Defense
Taiwanese people from Jiangxi